Jim Oldfield is an author, editor, and reviewer famous for his work with Commodore computers. He is married to Deb Oldfield and is the father of James, Jon, and Jason Oldfield.

He was the founder of the pioneering Commodore magazine, the Midnite Software Gazette, and was Associate Editor of .info (magazine). He is currently Vice President and Publisher at Abacus, a computer book and software publisher that specializes in supporting simulation software.

References
Abacus
INFO Magazine History

External links
Oldfield Family Page

Technical writers
Commodore people
Living people
Year of birth missing (living people)